Leslie Richard French (23 April 1904 – 21 January 1999) was a British actor of stage and screen.

French was primarily a theatre actor, as well as a director, singer and dancer, with a varied career that included the classics, musical revue, pantomime and ballet. He became most associated with the role of Ariel in William Shakespeare's The Tempest, and over the years he essayed many of Shakespeare's spirits and clowns, such as Puck, Feste and Touchstone.

Early life
French was born in Bromley, Kent, in 1904 and was educated at the London School of Choristers. He made his first appearance as a child actor in a 1914 Christmas show at the Little Theatre and left school the same year to join the touring Ben Greet Company as a stagehand and prompter. Hired as an understudy in the West End to Bobby Howes in the musical Mr. Cinders, French played the title role when the play went on regional tour.

Theatre
In 1930, he joined the Old Vic company, where he played Poins in Henry IV, Part I, Eros in Antony and Cleopatra, the Fool in King Lear and the role with which he became most associated with, Ariel in The Tempest. This latter role saw him share the stage with contemporaries John Gielgud (as Prospero) and Ralph Richardson (as Caliban), the first time these two actors appeared on stage together. French was the first male actor to essay the role of Ariel for many years and did so in nothing more than a small loincloth, helping to make this version something of a talking point at the time. French and Gielgud were also the inspiration for Eric Gill's carving of Prospero and Ariel above the entrance to the then new Broadcasting House in Portland Place.

French continued his stage career at the Old Vic and later the Open Air Theatre in Regent's Park, specialising in Shakespeare's spirits and clowns, such as Puck, Feste, Touchstone and of course Ariel, roles greatly enhanced by his singing and dancing ability. He also directed several plays including successful stagings of The Taming of the Shrew and As You Like It. 
As well as the classics, French also appeared in musical revue, pantomime and ballet.

Maynardville open-air theatre

In 1955 he helped to establish the new Shakespearean seasons at the Maynardville Open-Air Theatre in Cape Town, South Africa. This theatre, which had opened a short while before, on 1 December 1950, had multi-racial casts performing to multi-racial audiences. In 1963 he was awarded the key to the city for his work with the theatre.

Film and television
French made the occasional foray into film and television, appearing in two Luchino Visconti films, The Leopard (1963) and Death in Venice (1971), as well as many British television programmes. These included Dixon of Dock Green, Armchair Theatre, Z-Cars, The Avengers (the episode You Have Just Been Murdered), Jason King and The Singing Detective. His role as Mr. Woodhouse in a BBC serial of Jane Austen's Emma (1960) is considered one of his most memorable screen performances. French was also considered for the role of the First Doctor in the science fiction series Doctor Who; William Hartnell was cast. He finally appeared in the programme in its 1988 serial, Silver Nemesis, playing the Mathematician.

Selected filmography
 Radio Pirates (1935) – Leslie
 Peg of Old Drury (1935) – Alexander Pope
 This England (1941) – Johnny
 The Wallet (1952)
 Orders to Kill (1958) – Marcel Lafitte
 The Scapegoat (1959) – Lacoste
 The Singer Not the Song (1961) – Father Gomez
 The Leopard (1963) – Cavalier Chevally
 The Rescue Squad (1963) – Mr. Manse
 More Than a Miracle (1967) – Brother Giuseppe de Coopertino
 Death in Venice (1971) – Travel Agent
 Invitation to the Wedding (1983) – Hobbs
 The Living Daylights (1987) – Lavatory Attendant
 Young Toscanini (1987) – Comparsa (uncredited)

References

External links

1904 births
1999 deaths
People from Bromley
English male stage actors
English male film actors
English male television actors
Male actors from Kent
20th-century English male actors